Moon Doo-ri, better known by her stage name as Misfit (also known as Miss Pitt), is a South Korean songwriter, lyricist and artist. She is one of the studio artists at SM Entertainment headquarters in Seoul. Misfit has penned the lyrics of songs for various SM Town artists including BoA, TRAX, Super Junior, Girls' Generation, Shinee, f(x), Red Velvet and Exo as well as Jellyfish Entertainment's VIXX.

Career

2010-11: Debut as a lyricist, "Loview Music Instant"
Misfit made her debut in K-Pop music industry as a lyricist at S.M. Entertainment after writing the lyrics for "Up & Down" and "Ready or Not", tracks from Shinee's second studio album Lucifer. The album was released on July 19, 2010. In 2011, she wrote the lyrics of f(x)'s single "Pinocchio (Danger)" along with fellow label-mate songwriter Kenzie. The single was released on April 20, 2011. Later that year, she continued working with the agency by writing the lyrics for Super Junior's "Walkin'", a track from their fifth studio album Mr. Simple. Her first work outside the company was writing the lyrics for "Someday", a single from U-Kiss's second album Neverland which was released on September 1, 2011.

Misfit's debut as a vocal artist was her collaboration single "Loview Music Instant" with the hip hop artist, rapper and songwriter JQ. The single was digitally released on November 9, 2011. She continued her lyrical work for S.M. Entertainment by contributing her skills to the rock band TRAX's single "Blind" from their third EP and their song "Like a Dream" from 2011 Winter SMTown – The Warmest Gift.

2012-13: "Too Painful Breakup" and continued lyrical work
Misfit once again collaborated with JQ after featuring in his single "Too Painful Breakup" which was released on February 29, 2012.
She also wrote the lyrics for Exo's songs "Two Moons" and "Machine" from their debut EP Mama which was released on April 9, 2012. Misfit also went on to hold the credit for writing half of the songs on f(x)'s second EP Electric Shock including "Beautiful Stranger", "Love Hate" and "Let's Try". The EP was released on June 10, 2012 and received critical praise for its lyrics. She also wrote "The Top" from BoA's seventh Korean album Only One. She then penned the single "Spectrum", a special stage song by SM Town dance unit for 'SBS Gayo Daejeon' that was held on the December 29, 2012.

In 2013, Misfit once again collaborated with boy group Shinee by writing the lyrics to their promotional single "Shine (Medusa I)", a song produced by Teddy Riley. The song was released with their fourth Korean album Chapter 2. Why So Serious? – The Misconceptions of Me on April 26, 2013. She also penned the Exo's "Heart Attack", a track from their first studio album XOXO which was released on June 3, 2013. Her most recent contribution to S.M. Entertainment records are the lyrics for Henry Lau's debut single "Trap" featuring Kyuhyun and Taemin. The song was released in his first EP Trap which was released on June 7, 2013. Misfit was also credited for working on "Airplane" from f(x)'s second studio album Pink Tape released on July 29, 2013.

Discography

Collaboration singles
 "Loview Music Instant" (JQ and Misfit)
 "Too Painful Breakup" (JQ and Misfit)

As songwriter
This list contains songs written by Misfit, including those where she is credited as co-author.

References

External links
 SMTown Official Site

SM Entertainment people
South Korean musicians
South Korean lyricists
Living people
Year of birth missing (living people)